My Lady is a civil term of respect for a woman.

My Lady may also refer to:

 "My Lady" (Exo song), a song from the 2013 album XOXO
 "My Lady" (Jay Ghartey song), a 2009 single
 My Lady, a 1979 album and title song by Freddie Hart
 "My Lady", the B side of "My Sentimental Friend", a 1969 song by Herman's Hermits
 "My Lady", a 1967 single by Jet Harris

See also
 Lady (disambiguation)